The 2014 Tour of Chongming Island is a stage race held in China, with a UCI rating of 2.1. It was the tenth stage race of the 2014 Women's Elite cycling calendar.

Stages

Stage 1
14 May 2014 — Chongming to Qidong,

Stage 2
15 May 2014 — Chongxi to Chongxi,

Stage 3
16 May 2014 — Chongming to Chongming,

Classification leadership table

References

External links

Tour of Chongming Island
Tour of Chongming Island
Tour of Chongming Island
Tour of Chongming Island